Rubus xanthocarpus is a species of flowering plant in the raspberry genus Rubus, family Rosaceae. It is native to central and southern China, and has naturalized in Poland and the former Czechoslovakia. It is available from commercial suppliers. The orange-yellow fruit are edible, taste similar to raspberries, and can be eaten raw or made into preserves or wine.

References

xanthocarpus
Endemic flora of China
Flora of North-Central China
Flora of South-Central China
Flora of Southeast China
Plants described in 1891